The 2015–16 season is Klubi i Futbollit Bylis Ballsh's 42nd competitive season, first season in the Kategoria Superiore and 43rd year in existence as a football club.

Season overview

June
Bylis Ballsh was very active during the summer transfer window. On 1 June 2015, the 22-year old goalkeeper Shkëlzen Ruçi returned in the squad after spending the second part of 2014–15 season on loan at Elbasani.

July
On 16 July, Ardit Peposhi signed a two-year deal for Bylis with an option to extend it for another year. Five days later, Bylis purchased the Elbasani midfielder Orgest Gava, who terminated his contract follow the relegation of Elbasani in Albanian First Division. On 24 July, Bylis signed Renato Hyshmeri for free, after having been a free agent since his departure from Tirana. He signed a two-year contract.

August
On 6 August 2015, they sold the striker Arbër Dhrami to fellow Kategoria Superiore side Tërbuni Pukë. Two days later, Bylis bought Flamur Tairi from Renova for free; he signed a three-year contract. On 9 August, Bylis signed with Emmanuel Mbella from SVN Zweibrücken and Xhelil Asani from FK Napredok, both for free. On 13 August, the club signed the Kosovar defender Ahmet Haliti from Prishtina for an undisclosed fee. One week later, Bylis continued to be active in Kosovo by signing the goalkeeper Kushtrim Mushica from Prishtina. On the very same day, the club purchased the services of veteran midfielder Bekim Kuli, who returned in Ballsh after one-and-a-half year, signing a one-year deal and taking the vacant number 18. On 23 August, Bylis commenced their 2015–16 season with a 2–0 away lose to Kukësi with the goals scored by Mateus and Erick Flores.

Players

Squad information

Italics players who left the team during the season.
Bold players who came in the team during the season.

Transfers

In

Summer

Winter

Out

Summer

Winter

Competitions

Kategoria Superiore

League table

Results summary

Results by round

Matches

Albanian Cup

First round

Second round

Statistics

Squad stats
{|class="wikitable" style="text-align: center;"
|-
!
! style="width:70px;"|League
! style="width:70px;"|Cup
! style="width:70px;"|Total Stats
|-
|align=left|Games played       ||36||4 || 40
|-
|align=left|Games won          ||8 ||2 || 10
|-
|align=left|Games drawn        ||8 ||1 || 9
|-
|align=left|Games lost         ||20 ||1 || 21
|-
|align=left|Goals scored       ||27 ||9 || 36
|-
|align=left|Goals conceded     ||53 ||3 || 56
|-
|align=left|Goal difference    ||–26||6 ||–20
|-
|align=left|Clean sheets       ||10 ||3 || 13
|-

Top scorers

Last updated: 18 May 2016

Clean sheets
The list is sorted by shirt number when total appearances are equal.

Notes

References

External links

Bylis Ballsh
KF Bylis Ballsh seasons